The Texas Confederate Museum was a museum in Austin, Texas, in the United States. It opened in 1903, in a room on the ground floor of the Texas Capitol, and closed in 1988. It was run by the United Daughters of the Confederacy. From 1919 to 1988 it was housed on the ground floor of the Old Land Office Building, while the second floor housed a separate museum for the collections of the Daughters of the Republic of Texas. These museums in fact occupied the structure much longer than the Texas Land Office did. In 1990 the Old Land Office Building, after closing for renovations, reopened as the Capitol Visitors Center. The Museum, unable to find a new home, closed. The paper portion of its collection was donated to the Nita Stewart Haley Memorial Library in Midland, Texas, the artifacts to the Texas Civil War Museum near Fort Worth.

References

American Civil War museums in Texas
United Daughters of the Confederacy
Defunct museums in Texas
Museums in Austin, Texas
Lost Cause of the Confederacy
Confederate States of America monuments and memorials in Texas
1903 establishments in Texas
Museums established in 1903
Museums disestablished in 1988
1988 disestablishments in Texas